Show Up! is Joey Yung's sixth Cantonese full-length studio album, released on 30 September 2003. The main track of this album is also the theme for Joey's third solo concert and second concert series, "Neway Joey Yung Live Show Up!", which spanned six nights at the famous Hong Kong Coliseum.

Track listing
Panic Room
Show Up!
出賣 Betrayal
Déjà Vu
流汗 Sweating
歌姬 Diva
Cyber Stage
派對機器 Party Machine
心甘命抵 Total Willingness
遲鈍 Sluggish
N.G. Takes
勉強幸福 Reluctant Bliss
想得太遠 Thinking Too Much
會很美 Becoming Beautiful
我也不想這樣 I Don't Wanna Be Like That Either
Show Up! (Mandarin Version)

Joey Yung albums
2003 albums